Rafaël Govertsz Camphuysen (1597, Gorinchem – 1657, Amsterdam), was a Dutch Golden Age landscape painter.

Biography
According to the Rijksbureau voor Kunsthistorische Documentatie (RKD) he was the son of a surgeon and the nephew of the painter Dirk Rafaelsz Camphuysen.  He was a pupil of Jacob Gerritsz Cuyp and Dirck Govertsz and the older brother of Joachim Govertsz Camphuysen who studied with him. His sister Lysbeth married his pupil, the artist Aert van der Neer.

References

Rafaël Govertsz. Camphuysen on Artnet

1597 births
1657 deaths
Dutch Golden Age painters
Dutch male painters
People from Gorinchem